The 2011–12 Danish Handball League season, officially known as Jack & Jones Ligaen for sponsorship reasons.

League table

Regular season

Championship Round

Group 1

Group 2

Semifinals

|}

3rd Place

|}

Finals

|}

External links
scoresway

Handball competitions in Denmark
2011–12 domestic handball leagues
2011 in Danish sport
2012 in Danish sport